The inferior mesenteric lymph nodes consist of: 
 (a) small glands on the branches of the left colic and sigmoid arteries
 (b) a group in the sigmoid mesocolon, around the superior hemorrhoidal artery
 (c) a pararectal group in contact with the muscular coat of the rectum

Structure
The inferior mesenteric lymph nodes are lymph nodes present throughout the hindgut.

Function
The inferior mesenteric lymph nodes drain structures related to the hindgut. The lymph nodes drain into the superior mesenteric lymph nodes and ultimately to the preaortic lymph nodes. Lymph nodes surrounding the inferior mesenteric artery drain directly into the preaortic nodes.

They drain the descending colon and sigmoid parts of the colon and the upper part of the rectum.

Clinical significance
Colorectal cancer may metastasise to the inferior mesenteric lymph nodes. For this reason, the inferior mesenteric artery may be removed in people with lymph node-positive cancer. This has been proposed since at least 1908, by surgeon William Ernest Miles.

Additional images

References

Lymphatics of the torso